Our Universe is an American nature documentary series made for Netflix. The series is narrated by Morgan Freeman.

The series released on Netflix on November 22, 2022.

Cast
 Morgan Freeman

References

External links 
 
 

2022 American television seasons
2022 American television series debuts
English-language Netflix original programming
Netflix original documentary television series
Documentary films about nature